The Clan – Tale of the Frogs is a 1984 Finnish drama film directed by Mika Kaurismäki. It was entered into the 14th Moscow International Film Festival.

Cast
 Markku Halme as Aleksanteri Suuri Sammakko
 Minna Soisalo as Mirja Andersson
 Sakari Rouvinen as Roope Andersson
 Juhani Niemelä as Samuli Sammakko
 Antti Litja as Benjamin Sammakko
 Kari Väänänen as Leevi Sammakko
 Mikko Majanlahti as Pike Andersson
 Tuija Vuolle as Ulla Sammakko
 Soli Labbart as Saara-Muori Sammakko
 Eila Halonen as Raakel Sammakko
 Lasse Pöysti as Siilipää

References

External links
 

1984 films
1984 drama films
Finnish drama films
1980s Finnish-language films
Films directed by Mika Kaurismäki